Montford Johnson Wagner (born March 23, 1980) is an American professional golfer who plays on the PGA Tour.

Early years and amateur career
Wagner was born in Amarillo, Texas and grew up in upstate New York, where his father taught computer sciences at the United States Military Academy at West Point. He caddied for three summers at Hudson National in Westchester County, New York.

Wagner attended Virginia Tech, where he was a member of the golf team. He was a two-time All-Big East Conference selection and individual medalist at the 2002 Big East Conference Championship. He met his wife, Katie, at Virginia Tech; she was a player on the women's soccer team. Wagner earned a spot in the Virginia Tech Sports Hall of Fame.

Professional career
Wagner turned professional in 2002 and is currently a member of the PGA Tour. He was a member of the Nationwide Tour from 2003 to 2006. He earned his PGA Tour card for the 2007 season by finishing 2nd on the money list in the Nationwide Tour in 2006. In 2008 Wagner gained his first PGA Tour victory at the Shell Houston Open. The win earned him an invitation to the Masters Tournament and a two-year Tour exemption.

In 2010, Wagner finished 126th on the PGA Tour after a rally at the season finale fell short, just missing full Tour privileges. He was described as "delighted" because he started the week 153rd on the money list. Wagner's improved position meant avoiding the second stage of PGA Tour Q School and retaining conditional status on the PGA Tour rather than having to play out of the past champions category, earning him a few more starts.

On February 27, 2011, he won the Mayakoba Golf Classic at Riviera Maya-Cancun in a playoff over Spencer Levin with par on the first hole and regained his Tour card through 2013. It was the first time since 2000 that a golfer (Robert Allenby) finished 126th on the Tour and won the following season. Johnson won the first full-field event of 2012, the Sony Open in Hawaii, and extended his Tour privileges through 2014. He also moved into the Top 100 in the OWGR for the first time in his career, moving from 198 to 92. Wagner had a disappointing 2014 season on the PGA Tour and finished 150th on the FedEx Cup points list (the last position to retain any PGA Tour status), leaving him conditionally exempt for the 2014–15 season.

Having lost his full playing privileges, Wagner earned entry as a sponsor exemption for the 2015 Shell Houston Open. Wagner lost in a sudden-death playoff to J. B. Holmes on the second extra hole. This moved Wagner from 180th in the FedEx Cup standings to 81st. He would regain his PGA Tour card after finishing 87th in the FedEx Cup.

Amateur wins
this list may be incomplete
2001 Metropolitan Amateur
2002 Metropolitan Amateur

Professional wins (7)

PGA Tour wins (3)

PGA Tour playoff record (1–1)

Nationwide Tour wins (2)

Other wins (2)
2001 Metropolitan Open (as an amateur)
2002 Metropolitan Open

Results in major championships

CUT = missed the half-way cut
"T" = tied

Results in The Players Championship

CUT = missed the halfway cut
"T" indicates a tie for a place

Results in World Golf Championships

"T" = Tied
Note that the HSBC Champions did not become a WGC event until 2009.

See also
2006 Nationwide Tour graduates

References

External links

American male golfers
Virginia Tech Hokies men's golfers
PGA Tour golfers
Korn Ferry Tour graduates
Golfers from Texas
Sportspeople from Amarillo, Texas
Golfers from Charlotte, North Carolina
1980 births
Living people